The Laurence Olivier Award for Most Popular Show was an annual award presented by the Society of London Theatre in recognition of achievements in commercial London theatre. The awards were established as the Society of West End Theatre Awards in 1976, and renamed in 1984 in honour of English actor and director Laurence Olivier.

This award, which is determined solely by a fan-vote, was introduced in 2002, was not presented for 2003–2009, then was presented from 2010 through 2016, after which it was discontinued.

On the eight occasions that fans submitted votes on this award, it consistently went to a musical production, including twice each for The Phantom of the Opera, Wicked and Les Misérables.

Winners and nominees

2000s

2010s

References

External links
 

Laurence Olivier Awards
Audience awards